Tathiana Garbin was the defending champion but lost in the second round to Émilie Loit.

Top-seeded Magdalena Maleeva won in the final 3–6, 6–2, 6–4 against Anne Kremer.

Seeds
A champion seed is indicated in bold text while text in italics indicates the round in which that seed was eliminated.

  Magdalena Maleeva (champion)
  Anne Kremer (final)
  Tathiana Garbin (second round)
  Ángeles Montolio (quarterfinals)
  Rita Grande (first round)
  Rita Kuti-Kis (second round)
  Marta Marrero (first round)
 n/a

Draw

External links
 2001 Colortex Budapest Grand Prix draw

Budapest Grand Prix
2001 WTA Tour